Bukkur Fort (Urdu, Sindhi: بکر) is an island located in Rohri, Sukkur District of Sindh province in Pakistan.
Nowadays Bukkur island is occupied by an Army Public School, and the tomb of Sayyid Sadruddin, who was the son of Sayyid Muhammad Al-Makki.

Situation
The isolated fortress of Bukkur was situated on a rock in the Indus, between the towns of Rohri and Sukkur.

Structure
The fortress of Bukkur was constructed of brick, on a low rocky island of flint, 400 yards from the left bank of Indus and about fifty less from the eastern side of the river.
Its walls were loop-holed and flanked with towers that sloped to the water's edge: they did not exceed twenty feet in height.
There was a gateway on each side of the fortification facing Roree and Sukkur, and likewise two wickets.
The interior of the works was crowded with houses and mosques, many of which, as well as parts of the rock itself, appear above the wall.
In shape it was approximately oval, and it was 800 yards long, and 300 in breadth.
At some places the rock had been pared and scrapped, but Bukkur had no strength in its works and was formidable because of its position.

Early history
In 622 H. (1225 A.D.) Shums-ud-deen took an army to Oochch to overthrow Nasir-ud-deen, who had entrenched himself at Bukkur; to this place Shums-ud-deen detached Nizam-ul-Moolk, but Nasir-ud-deen, attempting to escape from Bukkur, took a boat, which foundered in a storm, and he was drowned.

Arms in 1839
In 1839 (First Anglo-Afghan War) the arms were the following:
The garrison consisted of 100 men of the Khyr poor Ameer
There were fifteen pieces of artillery
The walls enclosed the entire island with the exception of a small date grove on the northern side, where a landing was able to be affected from the right and the place would fall by escalade or it was able to be previously breached from the bank of the river.

References

Burnes, Alexander.- Travels into Bokhara:....., London: John Murray, Vol. I., 1834; Cabool: a personal narrative of a journey to and residence in that city, London: Jhon Murray, 1843.
Journal of the Asiatic Society of Bengal, Calcutta: Bishop's College Press, 1841, V. 10.

Further reading
Burton, R.F.- Sind revisited; with notices of the Anglo-Indian army..., R. Bentley, 1877, 2 vols.
Hughes Thomas, R.- Memoirs on Shikarpoor; the Studys of Roree and Bukkur;..., Bombay Education Society Press, 1855.
Kaye, J.W.- History of the war in Afghanistan, London: R. Bentley, 1857–58, 3 volumes.
Khan, A.Z.- History and culture on Sind:..., Karachi: Royal Book, 1980.
Roberts, Jeffery.- The Origins of Conflict in Afghanistan, Westport, Praeger, 2003.
Shaikh, M.A.- A monograph on Sindh....., Karachi: SMI University Press, 2013.

Sukkur District
Islands of Sindh

sv:Sukkur